Majas on a Balcony (Spanish: Las majas en el balcón) is an oil painting by Francisco Goya,  completed between 1808 and 1814, while Spain was engaged in the state of conflict after the invasion of Napoleon's French forces. The painting in the collection of Edmond de Rothschild in Switzerland is thought to be the original. Another version  at the Metropolitan Museum of Art in New York City is thought to be a copy.  A further copy, attributed to Leonardo Alenza, is in the Pezzoli collection in Paris.

Goya considered his "maja" works, such as this painting and his contemporaneous , a distraction from more serious works, such as his Disasters of War.

Description
The painting depicts two well-dressed women – "majas", beautiful young Spanish courtesans in elaborate clothing including lace mantillas – sitting behind the balustrade of a balcony, with two men standing inconspicuously in the shadows behind, probably pimps or clients.  There is a strong contrast between the light colours of the women and their richly decorated clothing in the foreground, and the plain heavy clothing of the men lurking in the background whose dark hats and cloaks conceal their features.  The painting has a strict geometric composition, with the top of the balustrade dividing the scene into two regions.  The top of the balustrade also forms the diagonal of a square from which the position of the figures is measured: the pilasters of the balustrade are in the lower half of the square, and the women lean towards each other in a triangle formed from the top half of the square.  The composition of the area above the balustrade falls into four equal quadrants of another square.

Background
The painting was probably made for the artist's own pleasure, possibly to decorate his own house. The original was one of eight paintings sold by Goya's son Javier Goya to Baron Isidore Justin Séverin Taylor in 1836, and it was displayed at the Louvre in Louis Philippe's Spanish gallery from 1838 to 1848.  It was held by Antoine, Duke of Montpensier;  his son Infante Antonio, Duke of Galliera sold it to Paul Durand-Ruel around 1911, who sold it to the Rothschild family.  While in Paris, Goya's painting was the inspiration for Édouard Manet's 1868–69  work The Balcony, which, in turn, inspired René Magritte to paint his version named "Perspective II, Manet's Balcony" in 1950 showing sitting and standing coffins in lieu of people.

Versions
The Metropolitan Museum of Art in New York City holds a version of the painting that had come into the collection of Infante Sebastian of Portugal and Spain by 1835.  It was thought to be a Goya original, although the attribution has been doubted since 1989. It may be a replica from 1835, possibly by Goya's son Javier Goya, or a damaged and heavily restored original, possibly a copy commissioned by the Infante.  It was confiscated by the Spanish state but returned to the Infante in 1860.  The Infante's son, sold the painting to Durand-Ruel in 1905, who sold it to Henry Osborne Havemeyer.  It was bequeathed from the estate of Louisine Havemeyer to the Metropolitan Museum of Art in 1929.  It is largely similar to the Rothschild version, but the two right hand figures are in somewhat different positions.

A copy attributed to Leonardo Alenza was formerly in the collections of Serafin García de la Huerta, then of Marquis José de Salamanca, and then , and is now in the Pezzoli collection in Paris.

See also
List of works by Francisco Goya

Notes

References
 Majas on a Balcony, Metropolitan Museum of Art
 Nuevas andanzas de Goya III, Majas en el Metropolitano (inSpanish)

External links

Paintings by Francisco Goya
Paintings in Switzerland